Michelle Rounds (29 April 1962) is a jazz singer, songwriter, and teacher from Australia.

Early life
The eldest daughter of five children, Rounds was born in Sydney Australia. Her father was an architect who sang and played guitar. Her grandmother sang, played several instruments, and was in the first all female band in Suva, Fiji in the early 1940s. Her family moved to Fiji when she was 11.

Career
Rounds is a scat singer who has released several albums. and is a supporter of using native language and dialect. On Let Me See Now in 2005 she collaborated with the Japanese band Steal & Shorty. In 2014 she released Time & Space, recorded with Egyptian Lil.garhy, who raps in Arabic and at the time of recording was 17 years old. In 1998 she won a Te Reo Award from TVNZ for her version of the Fijian "Era Bini Tu". This award is given to people who use indigenous languages in their music.

She regularly works with Nabil Khemir, Cesar Mora, and in the Australasia region with Tom Mawi.

She has been performing in Cairo, Egypt since 2009 and has performed at the Cairo Opera House, Kempinski Nile Hotel, El Sawy Culturewheel, and is a regular performer at Cairo Jazz Club. In 2014, she began giving vocal training to Egyptian children and adults. Michelle is represented and managed by Sulu Daunivalu her music is available on Spotify

Awards
 Te Reo Award – New Zealand from TVNZ for Keeping It Real (Pacific National Volume 1) (1998) 
 Vakalutuivoce Award – Fijian music award from FPRA (FPRA was established under the guidance of APRA) 1996 – Best Album (Draw Blood) and Best Female Artist.

Discography
 Draw Blood (1994)
 Contrasts (1996)
 A Matcha Chocolate Love Adventure (2005)
 Coffee Time Jazz (2005)
 Autumn Leaves (Spectra, 2010)
 Michelle Rounds and Her Amazing Friends (2013)
 Bliss (2021) available on Spotify.

References

External links
Official site

Australian soul singers
Funk singers
1962 births
Living people